Elisenberg is a tram stop on the Oslo Tramway.

Located at Elisenberg in Frogner, it was opened by Kristiania Elektriske Sporvei 1902 as a part of the Frogner Line between Majorstuen and Frogner. It is served by line 12 between Majorstuen and Kjelsås.

An underground mainline railway station named Elisenberg was to be constructed  underneath the tram stop, but was never finished and was never opened for traffic.

References

Oslo Tramway stations in Oslo
Railway stations opened in 1902